Velkopopovický Kozel is a Czech lager produced since 1874. The brewery was founded in Velké Popovice, a town 25 km (15 mi) southeast of Prague. Their symbol is a goat (Kozel means "male goat" in Czech). The company was bought by SABMiller in 2002 and sold to Asahi Breweries in 2016.

History

The first historical mention of the brewery dates back to the 14th century. The brewery in Velké Popovice, as we know it today, has its origins in the 19th century. After years of disagreements and the gradual decline of the brewery, it was bought by a rich industrial tycoon, František Ringhoffer, who was the Mayor of Smíchov and one of the most successful entrepreneurs at the time.

The brewery was built in 1875, though the first batch of Kozel beer was brewed in the previous year. The brewery introduced new technologies, giving rise to its modern history. At the turn of the 20th century the brewery passed through its second major reconstruction and its production capacity was increased to 90,000 hectoliters per year from the original 18,000 in the beginning.

The brewery survived the First World War, operating in a restricted mode and without much innovation. It grew again in the period between the wars. Kozel became famous for its dark 14° "Bock" beer. However the Second World War brought new production restrictions for all breweries and the protectorate brewery faced problems in acquiring the raw materials it needed.

After the war, the brewery was nationalized and faced a lack of workers. In 1951, therefore, the company management solved this problem by employing women in the brewery. The ratio of women and men remained almost 1:1 until 1962 and bottling was exclusively in female hands. In 1965, Kozel delivered the world's first beer in tank trucks and gave rise to the tradition of tank pubs.

After thirty years of socialism the brewery achieved independence in 1991 and in 1992 became a public limited company. In 2002, Kozel and the Radegast brewery were acquired by the Pilsner Urquell brewery, part of brewing conglomerate SABMiller. In 2016 it was one of the brands sold by SABMiller to Asahi Breweries, the divestment a result of the acquisition of the former by ABInBev, to meet with global antitrust regulation.

In 2012, Kozel canned beer was the subject of viral advertising in Russia: launched into space, beer dropped by parachute and everything was transmitted by online camera.

The Goat Mascot

The name Kozel and its emblem have their origins in the period after the First World War. Kozel means "male goat" in Czech, and a dark beer was at that time called bock, which means "goat" in German.

At that time there was a lot of competition in brewing. Brewery founder Emanuel Ringhoffer realized that it was necessary to distinguish the brewery from its competitors and started to brew in Velke Popovice a strong, dark beer to local tradition, known locally as Kozel. At that time a French painter passed through Velke Popovice, who was moved by the hospitality of the local people, and out of gratitude to them decided to create an emblem for the brewery. The painter was inspired by the figure of the goat, and turned it into an emblem. Since then, each beer from Velke Popovice was known as Kozel, and the animal mascot has decorated the label for almost a hundred years.

In the 1930s the owners tried to firm and consolidate the position of the brewery, and to give it a more attractive image, they brought a live goat to the brewery as an attraction. The Kozel brewery still has a live mascot and other attractions for visitors today. Up from the 1970s, after a few previous generations, all goats have been named after the original caregiver Olda and this name has been passed down from goat to goat for over 40 years.

Brewery
The brewery in Velké Popovice is open for visitors and tours are available.

Production
The company brews these different types of beer:
Kozel 10 – a 10° pale draught beer, with 4.2% ABV.
Kozel 11 – an 11° pale lager, with 4.6% ABV. It has been on the market since 2005.
Kozel Černý – a dark draught beer with 3.8% ABV. This beer has an unusual dark foam.
Kozel Řezaný – a mixture of light and dark lagers, with 4.6% ABV.
Kozel Florián – an 11° amber lager with 4.7% ABV
Kozel Mistrův Ležák –  a 12° pale lager, with 4.8% ABV.
Kozel Mistrův Pšeničný – a wheat ale, with 5.2% ABV.
Kozel Mistrův Tmavý – a dark lager, with 4.4% ABV.

Kozel has won many different awards including the Australian Beer Award, the Czech Beer of the Year, the World Beer Cup and more. Kozel Premium won awards at the World Beer Championships in Chicago in 1995, 1996 and 1997.

Exports and Licensed Production
Kozel became the best-selling Czech beer brand in the world. It is now sold in about thirty countries worldwide. Licensed production began in January 2001 in the Slovakia, later in Kaluga, Ulyanovsk and Vladivostok in Russia. In Hungary Kozel is brewed in Budapest and in Ukraine in Donetsk. Recently Kozel has entered new markets in Scandinavia, UK, Canada, Israel, Greece, Kazakhstan and Italy. Efes Moldova, Efes Georgia and Efes Turkey have started production of Kozel. Kozel Dark is showing steep growth in South Korean beer market.  The main reason for Kozel Dark's increase in sales volume is diversification of consumer tastes. In addition, Kozel Dark's stores have increased more than 30 times in the last two years. The average monthly sales of stores in Itaewon, Hongdae, and Gangnam, which are Seoul's major commercial areas, have averaged more than 1.6 million pieces per month.

Awards

Awards which has Kozel received in Czech and International beer competitions.

2012
1st place Velkopopovický Kozel 11° (category: 11° beer) - Czech Beer of the Year, Czech Republic

2011
2nd place Velkopopovický Kozel Medium (category: lager) - Zlatý pohár PIVEX, Czech Republic
1st place Velkopopovický Kozel Medium (best 11° in category lager) - Zlatý pohár PIVEX, Czech Republic
2nd place Velkopopovický Kozel Medium - Australian Beer Awards, Austrálie

2010
3rd place Velkopopovický Kozel Premium - World Beer Cup, USA
2nd place Velkopopovický Kozel Medium - Australian Beer Awards, Australia
2nd place Velkopopovický Kozel Premium - Australian Beer Awards, Australia
2nd place Velkopopovický Kozel Dark - Australian Beer Awards, Australia
1st place Velkopopovický Kozel Premium - Czech Beer of the Year, Czech Republic
2nd place Velkopopovický Kozel Medium - Czech Beer of the Year, Czech Republic

2009
Certificate of quality Velkopopovický Kozel Medium - Zlatý pohár PIVEX, Czech Republic
1st place Velkopopovický Kozel výčepní světlý - Zlatý pohár PIVEX, Czech Republic
1st place Velkopopovický Kozel Premium - Czech Beer of the Year, Czech Republic
3rd place Velkopopovický Kozel výčepní světlý - Czech Beer of the Year, Czech Republic

2008
Certificate of quality Velkopopovický Kozel výčepní světlý, Medium, Premium - Zlatý pohár PIVEX, Czech Republic
1st place Velkopopovický Kozel Medium - Czech Beer of the Year, Czech Republic
2nd place Velkopopovický Kozel Premium - Czech Beer of the Year, Czech Republic

2007
3rd place Velkopopovický Kozel výčepní tmavý - Australian Beer Awards, Australia
3rd place Velkopopovický Kozel Premium - Australian Beer Awards, Australia

2006
2nd place Velkopopovický Kozel výčepní světlý - Zlatý pohár PIVEX, Czech Republic
1st place Velkopopovický Kozel Premium - Monde Selection, Belgium
2nd place Velkopopovický Kozel výčepní světlý - Monde Selection, Belgium
2nd place Velkopopovický Kozel výčepní tmavý - Monde Selection, Belgium

2005
2nd place Velkopopovický Kozel výčepní světlý - Zlatý pohár PIVEX, Czech Republic
Certifikát kvality Velkopopovický Kozel Premium - Zlatý pohár PIVEX, Czech Republic

2004
1st place Velkopopovický Kozel Premium - World Beer Cup, USA
2nd place Velkopopovický Kozel výčepní světlý - World Beer Cup, USA
1st place Velkopopovický Kozel výčepní tmavý - Australian Beer Awards, Australia

2003
Gold certificate for long-term and balanced quality of the Beer Velkopopovický Kozel výčepní světlý - Zlatý pohár PIVEX, Czech Republic

2002
2nd place Velkopopovický Kozel Premium - Czech Beer of the Year, Czech Republic

2001
1st place Velkopopovický Kozel Premium - Beer festival, Helsinki, Finland

1997-1998, 2000-2005
Dark Beer of the year - Readers' Choice, Pivní kurýr, Czech Republic

1995-1997, 1999
1st place Velkopopovický Kozel Premium - Pivní mistrovství světa, Chicago USA

See also
Beer in the Czech Republic

References

External links
Velkopopovický Kozel Official Site
Velkopopovický Kozel Official Czech Site
Velkopopovický Kozel Official Facebook channel
Velkopopovický Kozel on Instagram
Velkopopovický Kozel on YouTube

Beer in the Czech Republic
1874 establishments in Austria-Hungary
Beer brands of the Czech Republic